The law of South America is one of the most unified in the world. All countries but Guyana can be said to follow civil law systems, although recent developments in the law of Brazil suggest a move towards the stare decisis doctrine.

Supranational agreements
 Andean Community
 Mercosur
 Union of South American Nations

Countries
 Law of Argentina
 Law of Bolivia 
 Law of Brazil 
 Law of Chile 
 Law of Colombia 
 Law of Ecuador 
 Law of Guyana 
 Law of Panama 
 Law of Paraguay 
 Law of Peru 
 Law of Suriname 
 Law of Trinidad and Tobago 
 Law of Uruguay 
 Law of Venezuela

Territories
 Law of Aruba 
 Law of Falkland Islands 
 Law of French Guiana 
 Law of South Georgia and the South Sandwich Islands

See also
 Legal systems of the world

References 

 
Legal systems